Alan or Allan, also known as Aland, in Iran may refer to:
 Alan, East Azerbaijan
 Alan, Gilan
 Alan-e Olya, Hamadan Province
 Alan-e Sofla, Hamadan Province
 Alan Rural District, in West Azerbaijan Province